Dương Thị Lan (born 2 September 1988) is a Vietnamese Paralympic swimmer.

At the 2012 Summer Paralympics in London she competed in the 100m SB5.

References 

Swimmers at the 2012 Summer Paralympics
Vietnamese female breaststroke swimmers
1988 births
Living people
Paralympic competitors for Vietnam
21st-century Vietnamese women
S5-classified Paralympic swimmers